Muslim Community Radio (MCR) was a radio station based in London, United Kingdom founded in 1998. The station used to run through FM radio, at 87.7 FM (formerly 1143AM, 87.8 FM & 101.4 FM prior to that), and only broadcast annually during the holy month of Ramadan. The slogan of the radio station is 'Ramadan Special'.

Description
The station broadcasts from the London Muslim Centre, which is located next to the East London Mosque on Whitechapel Road in Tower Hamlets. It started to broadcast in 1998 through a RSL, then through Spectrum in the next years, and since 2001 acquired the rights to broadcast 24 hours across east London during the holy month of Ramadan. Its presenters are volunteers. The Islamic Forum Europe runs the radio station with assistance from the Young Muslim Organisation, the Junior Muslim Circle, the East London Mosque and the London Muslim Centre.

It provides programmes for women, children's shows, quiz shows, fiqh sessions, taraweeh prayer, and shows such as Daily Halaqa, Qur'anic class, Easy Talk, Drive Time and others, in English and Bengali.

Programmes

 Daily Halaqa
 Dhikr AM
 Women's Programme
 Notun Jeeboner Shuchona (Bengali)
 Qur'anic Arabic
 Qur'an Class
 Community Matters
 Journey to Islam
 Children's Show
 Drive Time
 Iftar Programme
 Prime Time MCR Local/Global
 Easy Talk
 Suhur Programme (Bengali)

As of 2013 
 Children's Show
 Drive Time
 Women's Hour
 Dhikir AM
 Quranic Pearls
 Charity Fundraising

References

Radio stations established in 1998
Community radio stations in the United Kingdom
Radio stations in London
Islamic radio stations in the United Kingdom